Cricket in Mauritius is a sporadic affair, with occasional games arranged by enthusiastic zealots replacing any organised competition structure. Four clubs kept the game alive in Mauritius; Maurindia, Star, Spartan and United Cricket Clubs. Maurindia is arguably the leading club and twice yearly plays the Seychelle Islands representative team in reciprocal visits. The number of clubs have recently increased due to the increased popularity of the game in Mauritius and also the increase in expat population on the Island nation. The country currently has the following clubs actively playing cricket in Mauritius  

 Mauritian Expats Cricket Club
 Northfields Cricket Club  
 Black River United Cricket Club formerly known as Northern Star Cricket Club
 Coromandel United Cricket Club 
 Star Knitwear Sports Club
 Plaines Wilhems Cricket Club
 Etchelle Cricket Club
 E R Lions Cricket Club 
 MaurIndia Cricket Club
 West Coast Cricket Club 
 SSR Medical College
 Princes Tuna Cricket Club

There is a Mauritius Cricket Federation, but it is not an official member of the International Cricket Council, hence they are not entitled to participate in the official ICC events.  Mauritius were at one stage members of the African Cricket Association, with plans in 2011 to travel to Zimbabwe to play the Hindu Gymkhana Club. but were no longer members by 2021.

Mauritius Cricket Federation is the official body that governs and promotes the sport in Mauritius. The federation is a democratic body with an executive committee. The executive committee members are electing via a general election which happens every four years. The current president of the Mauritius Cricket Federation is Mr. Ali Parkar (G .O .SK)

In October 2000, the Beyond The Test World blog in Cricinfo produced its first ever listing about the independent countries and recognised political units where cricket has a presence. Mauritius were listed in the Africa region because there were four cricket clubs there and a cricket tourney, which was one of the criteria for the document.
But they did not make the cut
2006 was a memorable year for Mauritian cricket. The year 2006 has witnessed a transformation in the structure under which the sport is practised in Mauritius. The Maurindia Cricket Club organised the first Day-Night Cricket match at Anjaley Stadium between Indian High Commission – XI Vs Commonwealth XI that was telecasted live on MBC 3 for 4 hours. Maurindia Cricket Club and Riviere du Rempart Star Knitwear Sports Club have joined hands for the promotion of cricket in Mauritius and Federation of Cricket Clubs has been constituted under the patronage of Indian High Commission.

In April 2011, Tommy Hammond, of Tommy Hammond Sports, took South African first-class side KwaZulu-Natal Inland Under-15 side to Mauritius in what promised to be a most important and promising tour and proved to a ground-breaking tour in Mauritian cricket.

In June 2013, an action cricket style 6-a-side tournament was organised by Dolphins Cricket Club in Tamarin attracting 12 kids and adult teams from around the island.

MCB Moneygram T20 cricket league was organised in the year 2017 where Coromandel Cricket Club beat Northern Star Cricket Club in the final. The second edition of the tournament was organised in 2019 where Northern Star beat Northfields CC in the final. 

In 2020, the Mauritius Cricket Federation launched a 10-over format competition.

External links 
 Mauritius Cricket Team on ESPNCricinfo

References